Ivanka Muerоva is a Bulgarian sprint canoer who competed in the late 1980s. She won a bronze medal in the K-2 500 m event at the 1987 ICF Canoe Sprint World Championships in Duisburg.

References

Bulgarian female canoeists
Living people
Year of birth missing (living people)
ICF Canoe Sprint World Championships medalists in kayak